The Læså Formation is a lower Cambrian unit exposed on the Baltic island Bornholm, comprising two members: the lower, the Broens Odde Member, colloquially and previously informally termed "green shales" (Grønne Skifre), a 100 m thick glauconitic silt-sandstone occasionally bearing extremely acritarch-rich phosphatic pebbles; gradually transitioning upwards into the upper, the 3 m thick Rispebjerg Member, a sandstone.

References

Geologic formations of Denmark
Cambrian System of Europe
Paleozoic Denmark
Paleontology in Denmark
Formations